Alexa Hunn is a former England women's international footballer. Hunn played for Charlton Athletic. Hunn's greatest achievement was representing her country at u16, u18 and senior level. Whilst playing for England vs Scotland at Wembley, Hunn scored a solo goal, later compared to that of Maradona’s against England in 1986. Domestically Hunn was part of the Charlton FA cup winning team 2005 FA Women's Cup Final.

Honours
Charlton
 FA Women's Cup: 2000, 2005

References

Living people
FA Women's National League players
Charlton Athletic W.F.C. players
English women's footballers
England women's international footballers
Women's association football midfielders
Year of birth missing (living people)
England women's youth international footballers